Walter Niels "Cuckoo" Christensen (October 24, 1899 – December 20, 1984) born in San Francisco, California, was a baseball outfielder for the Cincinnati Reds (-).

Christensen led the National League in on-base percentage (.426) in 1926. In two seasons, he played in 171 games and had 514 at bats, 66 runs, 162 hits, 21 doubles, 7 triples, 57 RBIs, 12 stolen bases, 60 walks, a .315 batting average, .392 on-base percentage, .383 slugging percentage, 197 total bases and 16 sacrifice hits. Defensively, he posted a .970 fielding percentage playing at all three outfield positions.

Christensen played with the Milwaukee Brewers of the American Association between 1930 and 1933, hitting .362, .325, .325 and .307.

He died in Menlo Park, California, at the age of 85.

References

Sources

1899 births
1984 deaths
Baseball players from California
Major League Baseball outfielders
Cincinnati Reds players
Calgary Bronchos players
St. Paul Saints (AA) players
Columbus Senators players
Mission Reds players
Milwaukee Brewers (minor league) players
Houston Buffaloes players
People from Menlo Park, California